Below is a bibliography of published works written by Thomas Merton, the Trappist monk of The Abbey of Our Lady of Gethsemani. Several of the works listed here have been published posthumously. The works are listed under each category by date of publication.

Autobiographies

Biblical topics

Biographies

Contemplation and meditations

 (Preview at Google Books)

 [1st published 1968] Republished in the UK as 

 [1st published 1950]

Eastern thought

Journal writings

Letters

Monastic, church and spiritual life

Novel

Poetry

Social issues

 (Revised ed. of Thomas Merton On Peace. The McCall Publishing Company. 1971.)

Other

See also 
List of works about Thomas Merton

References

Bibliographies by writer
Bibliographies of American writers
Bibliographies of French writers
Christian bibliographies